Anthony Eyton  (born 17 May 1923) is a British artist and member of the Royal Academy of Arts.

Early life and education
Eyton was born in Teddington, Middlesex, and studied fine art at Reading University under James Anthony Betts before leaving for the Army during the Second World War (1942–1947). After demobilisation, he immediately resumed his studies, this time at Camberwell School of Art until 1950. In 1951, he travelled to Italy after winning an Abbey Major Scholarship.

Art practice
Eyton is a figurative painter working in what could be termed the post-Impressionist tradition. He has exhibited extensively throughout Britain at leading galleries such as the Royal Academy, the Tate Gallery, the South London Gallery, the Hayward Gallery and the Imperial War Museum. He has won many awards, including the John Moores Prize in 1972. He was elected an Associate Royal Academician (A.R.A) in 1976, a full member in 1986 and a Senior R.A. in 1998. Among his many significant commissions was the 1994 invitation by the Tate Gallery to work in the Bankside Power Station prior to it becoming Tate Modern. Based in London, he has continued to work and exhibit into his eighties. Examples of Eyton's painting are held in major public and private collections throughout the world.

Teaching
Eyton began teaching at Camberwell in 1955 and continued there as a part-time tutor until the 1980s. He was Head of Painting at St. Lawrence College, Kingston, Ontario in 1969 and taught at the Royal Academy Schools from 1964 to 1999.

External links
 
 Royal Academy website page
 Tate Collection website page

References

1923 births
Living people
Alumni of Camberwell College of Arts
Alumni of the University of Reading
British Army personnel of World War II
English artists
Post-impressionist painters
Royal Academicians